The ceremony for the 34th Annual Annie Awards, honoring the best in animation in 2006, was held on February 11, 2007, at the Alex Theatre in Glendale, California.

The nominations were announced on December 4, 2006.

Winners are marked in bold text.

Production nominees

Best Animated Feature
 Cars
 Happy Feet
 Monster House
 Open Season
 Over the Hedge

Best Home Entertainment Production
 Bambi II
 The Adventures of Brer Rabbit
 Winnie-the-Pooh: Shapes & Sizes

Best Animated Short Subject
 No Time for Nuts
 Adventure Time
 Fumi and the Bad Luck Foot
 "Weird Al" Yankovic - "Don't Download This Song"

Best Animated Television Commercial
 United Airlines - "Dragon"
 Candace Kane's Candy Factory - "Ka-chew!"
 ESPN - "Believe"
 Hilton Hotels & Resorts - "Dancing Couple"
 Saint Louis Zoo - "Giraffe"

Best Animated Television Production
 Foster's Home for Imaginary Friends
 Charlie and Lola
 The Fairly OddParents
 King of the Hill
 Wow! Wow! Wubbzy!

Best Animated Video Game
 Flushed Away: The Game
 Monster House
 SpongeBob SquarePants: Creature from the Krusty Krab

Individual achievement

Animated Effects
 Scott Cegielski – Flushed Away – DreamWorks Animation & Aardman Features
 Keith Klohn – Cars – Pixar Animation Studios
 David Stephens – Open Season – Sony Pictures Animation/Columbia Pictures
 Erdem Taylan – Cars – Pixar Animation Studios
 John David Thornton – Ice Age: The Meltdown – Blue Sky Studios

Character Animation in a Feature Production
 Gabe Hordos – Flushed Away – DreamWorks Animation & Aardman Features
 Line Andersen – Flushed Away – DreamWorks Animation & Aardman Features
 Carlos Baena – Cars – Pixar Animation Studios
 Bobby Podesta – Cars – Pixar Animation Studios
 Kristof Serrand – Over The Hedge – DreamWorks Animation

Character Animation in a Television Production
 Yu Jae Myung – Avatar: The Last Airbender "The Blind Bandit" – Nickelodeon
 Joshua Jennings – Moral Orel – ShadowMachine Films
 Eileen Kohlhepp – Family Guy – Fox TV
 Sihanouk Mariona – Robot Chicken – ShadowMachine Films

Character Design in an Animated Feature Production
 Nico Marlet – Over The Hedge – DreamWorks Animation
 Peter de Sève – Ice Age: The Meltdown – Blue Sky Studios
 Carter Goodrich – Open Season – Sony Pictures Animation/Columbia Pictures

Character Design in an Animated Television Production
 Mike Kunkel – The Life & Times of Juniper Lee "Party Monsters" – Cartoon Network Studios
 Ben Balistreri – Danny Phantom "King Tuck" – Nickelodeon
 Carlos Ramos – The X’s "Homebody" – Nickelodeon
 Eric Robles – The X’s "You Only Sneeze Twice" – Nickelodeon

Directing in an Animated Feature Production
 Tim Johnson & Karey Kirkpatrick – Over The Hedge – DreamWorks Animation
 David Bowers & Sam Fell – Flushed Away – DreamWorks Animation & Aardman Features
 Gil Kenan – Monster House – Columbia Pictures ImageMovers/Amblin Entertainment
 John Lasseter – Cars – Pixar Animation Studios
 Carlos Saldanha – Ice Age: The Meltdown – Blue Sky Studios

Directing in an Animated Television Production
 Giancarlo Volpe – Avatar: The Last Airbender “The Drill” – Nickelodeon
 Shaun Cashman – The Grim Adventures of Billy & Mandy “Hill Billy” – Cartoon Network Studios
 Craig McCracken – Foster’s Home for Imaginary Friends “Bus the Two of Us” – Cartoon Network Studios
 Guy Vasilovich – Growing Up Creepie “The Tell-Tale Poem” – Mike Young Productions

Music in an Animated Feature Production
 Randy Newman – Cars – Pixar Animation Studios
 John Debney – The Ant Bully – Warner Bros. Pictures Presents in Association with Legendary Pictures, a Playtone Production in Association with DNA Productions
 Gordon Goodwin – Bah, Humduck! A Looney Tunes Christmas – Warner Bros. Animation
 Laura Karpman – A Monkey’s Tale – Dedica Group
 John Powell – Ice Age: The Meltdown – Blue Sky Studios

Music in an Animated Television Production
 James L. Venable & Jennifer Kes Remington – Foster's Home for Imaginary Friends: "One False Movie" (Cartoon Network Studios)
 Brad Benedict, Mark Fontana & Erik Godal – Squirrel Boy: "A Line in the Sandwich" (Cartoon Network Studios)
 John King – Shorty McShorts' Shorts: "Boyz on Da Run Part 1" (Walt Disney Television Animation)
 Steve Marston – Jakers! The Adventures of Piggley Winks: "The Gift" (Mike Young Productions)

Production Design in an Animated Feature Production
 Pierre-Olivier Vincent – Flushed Away – DreamWorks Animation & Aardman Features
 William Cone – Cars – Pixar Animation Studios
 Andy Harkness – Open Season – Sony Pictures Animation/Columbia Pictures
 Michael Humphries – Open Season – Sony Pictures Animation/Columbia Pictures
 Paul Shardlow – Over The Hedge – DreamWorks Animation

Production Design in an Animated Television Production
 Martin Ansolabehere – Foster's Home for Imaginary Friends “Good Wilt Hunting” – Cartoon Network Studios
 Alan Bodner - The Life and Times of Juniper Lee “Water We Fighting For” - Cartoon Network Studios
 Bob Boyle – Wow! Wow! Wubbzy – “Tale of Tails” – Produced by Bolder Media, Inc. in association with Film Roman, a Starz Company.
 Dan Krall – My Gym Partner’s A Monkey “Grub Drive” – Cartoon Network Studios
 Sue Mondt – Camp Lazlo “Hard Days Samson” – Cartoon Network Studios

Storyboarding in an Animated Feature Production
 Gary Graham Over The Hedge – DreamWorks Animation
 Thom Enriquez Over The Hedge – DreamWorks Animation
 William H. Frake III Ice Age: The Meltdown – Blue Sky Studios
 Kris Pearn Open Season – Sony Pictures Animation/Columbia Pictures
 Simon Wells Flushed Away – DreamWorks Animation & Aardman Features

Storyboarding in an Animated Television Production
 Li Hong – The X's “You Only Sneeze Twice” – Nickelodeon
 Troy Adomitis - American Dragon: Jake Long “Breakout” – Walt Disney Television Animation
 Ben Balistreri – Danny Phantom “Urban Jungle” – Nickelodeon
 Shaut Nigoghossian – Danny Phantom “Reality Trip” – Nickelodeon
 Adam Van Wyk – Hellboy “Sword of Storms” – Film Roman, a Starz Media Co.

Voice Acting in an Animated Feature Production
 Ian McKellen – Voice of the Toad – Flushed Away – DreamWorks Animation & Aardman Features
 Maggie Gyllenhaal – Voice of Zee – Monster House – Columbia Pictures ImageMovers/Amblin Entertainment
 Sam Lerner – Voice of Chowder – Monster House – Columbia Pictures ImageMovers/Amblin Entertainment
 Spencer Locke – Voice of Jenny – Monster House – Columbia Pictures ImageMovers/Amblin Entertainment
 Wanda Sykes – Voice of Stella – Over The Hedge – DreamWorks Animation

Voice Acting in an Animated Television Production
 Eartha Kitt – Voice of Yzma – The Emperor's New School “Kuzclone” – Walt Disney Television Animation
 Keith Ferguson – Voice of Blooregard – Foster’s Home for Imaginary Friends “Squeeze the Day” – Cartoon Network Studios
 Mila Kunis – Voice of Meg Griffin – Family Guy “Barely Legal” – Fuzzy Door Productions
 Russi Taylor – Voice of Ferny – Jakers! “Mi Galeon” – Mike Young Productions
 Patrick Warburton – Voice of Kronk – The Emperor’s New School “Kuzclone” – Walt Disney Television Animation

Writing in an Animated Feature Production
 Dick Clement & Ian La Frenais and Chris Lloyd & Joe Keenan and Will Davies – Flushed Away – DreamWorks Animation & Aardman Features
 Rich Burns – Brother Bear 2 – DisneyToon Studios
 Dan Harmon, Rob Schrab & Pamela Pettler – Monster House – Columbia Pictures Presents an ImageMovers/Amblin Entertainment
 Dan Fogelman – Cars – Pixar Animation Studios
 George Miller, John Collee, Judy Morris & Warren Coleman – Happy Feet – Warner Bros. Pictures Presents in Association with Village Roadshow Pictures, A Kennedy Miller Production in Association with Animal Logic Film

Writing in an Animated Television Production
 Ian Maxtone-Graham – The Simpsons “The Seemingly Neverending Story” – Gracie Films
 Kirker Butler – Family Guy “Barely Legal” – Fuzzy Door Productions
 Tom Sheppard – My Gym Partner’s a Monkey “Nice Moustache” – Cartoon Network Studios
 Dan Vebber – American Dad “American Dad Afterschool Special” – Fuzzy Door Productions/Underdog Productions
 John Viener – Family Guy “The Griffin Family History” – Fuzzy Door Productions

Juried awards

June Foray Award
Significant and benevolent or charitable impact on the art and industry of animation.
 Stephen Worth

Winsor McCay Award
Recognition of lifetime or career contributions to the art of animation.
 Bill Plympton
 Genndy Tartakovsky
 Andreas Deja

Ub Iwerks Award
 None

Special Achievement
 None

Certificate of Merit
 Bill Matthews
 Michael Fallik
 Marc Deckter
 Eric Graf

References

External links

 34th Annual Annie Nominations and Awards Recipients

2006
2006 film awards
Glendale, California
Annie Awards
2006 awards in the United States